The SU-14 was a prototype Soviet heavy self-propelled gun built on a T-35 chassis. The original prototype mounted a 152 mm gun M1935 (Br-2); the SU-14-1 variant of 1936 carried a 203 mm gun B-4 which could fire 48.9 kilogram shells at ranges up to 25 km. Its armour was 20 to 50 mm thick. It never entered serial production.

Development 
Work on the vehicle began in 1933, with a prototype built a year later. In 1935, several disadvantages were reworked and another prototype was built and designated SU-14-1. In February 1937, the prototypes successfully completed a series of performance tests.  It was expected to go into production the following year.  However, in 1937, Chief Designer P. N. Siachyntov was removed from the program, thus halting further development of the project.

In 1940, in connection with plans to use them during the war with Finland, armor was added to the two existing prototypes and they were redesignated SU-14-2. They later took part in the defense of Moscow in 1941 alongside the prototype SU-100Y. The first one (the original SU-14 prototype) was scrapped in 1960.  The second prototype, as an SU-14-2, is on display at the Tank Museum in Kubinka.

Gallery

External links
 SPG SU-14-BR2 – Walk around photos

World War II self-propelled artillery
Self-propelled artillery of the Soviet Union
152 mm artillery
Abandoned military projects of the Soviet Union
Military vehicles introduced in the 1930s